Peterjohnsiidae is a small family of millipedes belonging to the order Chordeumatida. These millipedes range from 3 mm to 8 mm in length and are found in Australia. Species in this family exhibit sexual dimorphism in segment number: adult males have 30 segments, but adult females have 32 segments (counting the collum as the first segment and the telson as the last). In adult males in this family, the gonopod complex involves three leg pairs (pairs 8 through 10) rather than just the two (pairs 8 and 9) usually modified into gonopods in this order.

Genera:
 Peterjohnsia Mauriès, 1987

References

Chordeumatida
Millipede families